The 2024 NBA All-Star Game will be an exhibition game played on February 18, 2024. It will be the 73rd edition of the NBA All-Star Game. It will be hosted by the Indiana Pacers at Gainbridge Fieldhouse. This is the second time that Indianapolis will host the All-Star Game; the last time the game was played in the city was in 1985 at the Hoosier Dome. The game will be televised by TNT for the 22nd consecutive year.

The announcement of the site selection was initially made on December 13, 2017 at a press conference held by the Indiana Pacers. In attendance at the announcement was NBA commissioner Adam Silver, Pacers owner Herb Simon, Governor Eric Holcomb, and Mayor Joe Hogsett. The team had submitted its bid for the game in grand fashion with then-team president and NBA legend Larry Bird delivering the bid in a specially livered Dallara IR-07. On November 25, 2020, the NBA announced that the Pacers would host the All-Star Game in 2024 instead of 2021 due to NBA schedule changes as a result of the COVID-19 pandemic and schedule conflicts with the 2021 NCAA Division I men's basketball tournament, which was held in several venues around Indianapolis and Central Indiana.

Additional events including a celebrity game and practices open to the public are expected to be held at the adjacent Indiana Convention Center. The City of Indianapolis hopes to see an 8-figure ($10,000,000) economic impact surrounding the game.

References

External links
2024 NBA All-Star Game at nba.com
2024 NBA All-Star Weekend  at AllStarWeekendIndiana.com

NBA All-Star Game
NBA All-Star Game
National Basketball Association All-Star Game
Basketball competitions in Indianapolis
NBA All-Star Game
NBA All-Star Game